The Basque–Icelandic pidgin was a Basque-based pidgin spoken in Iceland in the 17th century. It consisted of Basque, Germanic and Romance words.

Basque whale hunters who sailed to the Icelandic Westfjords used the pidgin as a means of rudimentary communication with locals. It might have developed in Westfjords, where manuscripts were written in the language, but since it had influences from many other European languages, it is more likely that it was created elsewhere and brought to Iceland by Basque sailors. Basque entries are mixed with words from Dutch, English, French, German and Spanish. The Basque–Icelandic pidgin is thereby not a mixture between Basque and Icelandic, but between Basque and other languages. It was named from the fact that it was written down in Iceland and translated into Icelandic.

Only a few manuscripts have been found containing Basque–Icelandic glossary, and knowledge about the pidgin is limited.

Basque whalers in Iceland 
Basque whalers were among the first to catch whales commercially; they spread to the far corners of the North Atlantic and even reached Brazil. They started coming to Iceland around 1600. In 1615, after becoming shipwrecked and getting into a conflict with the locals, Basque sailors were massacred in an event that would be known as the Slaying of the Spaniards. Basques continued to sail to Iceland, but for the second half of the 17th century French and Spanish whalers are more often mentioned in Icelandic sources.

History of the glossaries
Only a few anonymous glossaries have been found. Two of them were found among the documents of 18th century scholar Jón Ólafsson of Grunnavík, titled:
 Vocabula Gallica ("French words"). Written in the latter part of the 17th century, a total of 16 pages containing 517 words and short sentences, and 46 numerals.
 Vocabula Biscaica ("Biscayan (Basque) words"). A copy written in the 18th century by Jón Ólafsson, the original is lost. Contains a total of 229 words and short sentences, and 49 numerals. This glossary contains several pidgin words and phrases.

These manuscripts were found in the mid-1920s by the Icelandic philologist Jón Helgason in the Arnamagnæan Collection at the University of Copenhagen. He copied the glossaries, translated the Icelandic words into German and sent the copies to professor C.C. Uhlenbeck at Leiden University in the Netherlands. Uhlenbeck had expertise in Basque, but since he retired from the university in 1926, he gave the glossaries to his post-graduate student Nicolaas Gerard Hendrik Deen. Deen consulted with the Basque scholar Julio de Urquijo, and in 1937, Deen published his doctoral thesis on the Basque–Icelandic glossaries. It was called Glossaria duo vasco-islandica and written in Latin, though most of the phrases of the glossaries were also translated into German and Spanish.

In 1986 Jón Ólafsson's manuscripts were brought back from Denmark to Iceland.

There is also evidence of a third contemporary Basque–Icelandic glossary. In a letter, the Icelandic linguist Sveinbjörn Egilsson mentioned a document with two pages containing "funny words and glosses" and he copied eleven examples of them. The glossary itself has been lost, but the letter is still preserved at the National Library of Iceland. There is no pidgin element in the examples he copies.

The fourth glossary 
A fourth Basque–Icelandic glossary was found at the Houghton Library at Harvard University. It had been collected by the German historian Konrad von Maurer when he visited Iceland in 1858, the manuscript is from the late 18th century or the early 19th century. The glossary was discovered around 2008, the original owner hadn't identified the manuscript as containing Basque text. Only two of the pages contain Basque–Icelandic glossary, the surrounding material includes unrelated things such as instructions about magic and casting love spells. It is clear that the copyist wasn't aware that they were copying Basque glossary, as the text has the heading "A few Latin glosses". Many of the entries are corrupted or wrong, seemingly made by someone not used to writing. A large number of the entries aren't a part of Deen's glossary, and so the manuscript is thought to be a copy of an unknown Basque–Icelandic glossary. A total of 68 words and phrases could be discerned, but with some uncertainty.

Pidgin phrases
The manuscript Vocabula Biscaica contains the following phrases which contain a pidgin element:

A majority of these words are of Basque origin:
 atorra, atorra 'shirt'
 balia, balea 'baleen whale'
 berria, berria 'new'
 berrua, beroa 'warm'
 biskusa, (Lapurdian) loan word  'biscuit', nowadays meaning gâteau Basque (cf. Spanish , ultimately from Old French )
 bocata
 bustana, buztana 'tail'
 eta, eta 'and'
 galsardia, galtzerdia 'the sock'
 gissuna, gizona 'the man'
 locaria, lokarria 'the tie/lace(s)'
 sagarduna, sagardoa 'the cider'
 ser, zer 'what'
 sumbatt, zenbat 'how many'
 travala, old Basque trabaillatu, related to French  and Spanish trabajar 'to work'
 usnia, esnea 'the milk'
 bura, 'butter', from Basque Lapurdian loan word  (cf. French , Italian  and Occitan )

Some of the words are of Germanic origin:
 cavinit, old Dutch equivalent of modern German  'nothing at all' or Low German  'not a bit'
 for in the sentence sumbatt galsardia for could be derived from many different Germanic languages
 for mi, English 'for me' (used both as subject and object; 'I' and 'me') or Low German ''
 for ju, English 'for you' (used both as subject and object) or Low German ''

And others come from the Romance languages:
 cammisola, Spanish  'shirt'
 fenicha, Spanish  'to fornicate'
 mala, French or Spanish  'bad' or 'evil'
 trucka, Spanish  'to exchange'

All nouns and adjectives in the pidgin are marked with Basque's definite article suffix -a, even in cases where the suffix would be ungrammatical in Basque. The order of nouns and adjectives is also reversed. For example, berrua usnia ('warm milk-DET') in the pidgin versus  ('milk warm-DET') in Basque.

Although there are quite a few Spanish and French words listed in the glossaries, this is not a sign of the pidgin language, but rather a result of French and Spanish influence on the Basque language throughout the ages, since Basque has taken many loan words from its neighbouring languages. Furthermore, many of the people in the Basque crews that came to Iceland might have been multilingual, speaking French and/or Spanish as well.

Other examples 
These examples are from the recently discovered Harvard manuscript:

The first phrase, nola dai fussu ("What's your name?"), might be written with standardized (but ungrammatical) Basque as "". That is a morphologically simplified construction of the correct Basque sentence "".

A section in Vocabula Biscaica goes over a few obscenities:

See also
 Algonquian–Basque pidgin, a Basque-based pidgin in Canada
 Russenorsk, a Russian–Norwegian pidgin

Notes

References

Bibliography
 
 
  Re-printed in 1991 in Anuario del Seminario de Filología Vasca Julio de Urquijo Vol. 25, Nº. 2, pp. 321–426 (in Basque). Archived on 2019-03-01.

Manuscripts 
  – Written in the latter part of the 17th century, a total of 16 pages. A part of Jón Ólafsson's manuscript "AM 987 4to".
  – A copy written in the 18th century by Jón Ólafsson, a total of 10 pages. A part of his manuscript "AM 987 4to".
  – Two pages, a part of the manuscript "MS Icelandic 3" which contains 145 sheets.

Further reading 

 
 

Basque diaspora in North America
Basque language
Languages of Iceland
Pidgins and creoles
17th century in France
17th century in Spain
University of Copenhagen
Extinct languages of Europe
Basque-based pidgins and creoles
Languages attested from the 17th century
Languages extinct in the 17th century